Mirko Drudi (born 22 February 1987) is an Italian footballer who plays for  club Monopoli as a defender.

Club career
On 2 September 2019, he joined Pescara.

On 26 July 2022, Drudi signed a two-year contract with Monopoli.

References

External links
 

1987 births
People from Cesena
Footballers from Emilia-Romagna
Sportspeople from the Province of Forlì-Cesena
Living people
Association football defenders
Italian footballers
U.S. Lecce players
A.S. Cittadella players
Trapani Calcio players
U.S.D. Novese players
A.S.D. Riccione 1929 players
Delfino Pescara 1936 players
S.S. Monopoli 1966 players
Serie B players
Serie C players